Viola Roseboro' (December 3, 1857 — January 29, 1945) was an American literary editor. She was the fiction editor for McClure's and, later, for Collier's, in which role she discovered several important authors. Ida Tarbell called her a "born reader" and a "reader of real genius".

Early life
Roseboro' was born in Pulaski, Tennessee, in 1857. Her parents, the Reverend Samuel Reed Roseboro' and Martha Colyar, were abolitionists, and the family was soon forced to flee to Mattoon, Illinois, where Roseboro' lived for the duration of the American Civil War. Her uncle was Tennessee publisher and politician Arthur St. Clair Colyar.

She graduated from the Fairmount School in Monteagle, Tennessee, and, under the name Viola Roseborough, briefly pursued a theatrical career with the Shook and Collier Company. She moved to New York City in 1882 and continued performing; however, in 1887 she was forced to retire after she developed pneumonia.

Literary career
Roseboro' began her literary career with a weekly arts column in The Nashville Daily American. By 1887, her writing was being published in The Century Magazine, The Cosmopolitan, and The Daily Graphic; this brought her in contact with S. S. McClure, who hired her as a reader for the McClure Syndicate, and, subsequently, for McClure's Magazine.

At McClure's, her subordinates included Sonya Levien, who she is credited with having "mentored",
 Willa Cather (who Roseboro' may have hired, or caused to be hired) and Witter Bynner, whose first poems were published in McClure's with her approval; Bynner subsequently described his job as delivering manuscripts from the editorial office to Roseboro's apartment.

When McClure lost control of the magazine in 1911, Roseboro' left her position there, and by 1913 had joined the staff of Collier's. After her position at Collier's ended, she became a freelance editorial consultant, and briefly worked again at McClure's after McClure regained control in 1921.<ref name=

Her discoveries included Jack London, Booth Tarkington (whose The Gentleman from Indiana she described as having been "sent by God Almighty"), and William Sidney Porter, from whom she bought the first story under the pseudonym "O. Henry".

Influence on Cather
Roseboro' has been credited with having enabled the success of Willa Cather's novel My Ántonia by suggesting, after having read an earlier version of the manuscript, that Cather rewrite it with Jim Burden as the viewpoint character.

Literary scholar Merrill Skaggs identified Roseboro' as Willa Cather's probable inspiration for Myra Henshawe, protagonist of Cather's 1926 novel My Mortal Enemy, and posited that although Cather said the inspiration for Henshawe had died in 1911, this was a reference to Roseboro' having left McClure's in that year. Similarly, literary scholar Elizabeth Ammons has speculated that Roseboro's 1907 short story "The Mistaken Man" "provided the spark for" Cather's 1912 novel Alexander's Bridge.

Writing
Roseboro' continued writing her own fiction even after becoming an editor, including the novels The Joyous Heart (1903) and Storms of Youth (1920), and the short story collections Old Ways and New (1892) and Players and Vagabonds (1904).

Notes

References

External links

 The Consecrated Eminence—an online article with images from the Gertrude Hall Brownell Collection of Viola Roseboro' Correspondence at Amherst College.
 Gertrude Hall Brownell Collection of Viola Roseboro' Correspondence at the Amherst College Archives & Special Collections

1857 births
1945 deaths
American women editors
American literary editors
People from Pulaski, Tennessee